Tarka sastra (IAST:) is a Sanskrit term for the philosophy of dialectics, logic and reasoning, and art of debate that analyzes the nature and source of knowledge and its validity. Shastra in Sanskrit means that which gives teaching, instruction or command. Tarka means debate or an argument. According to one reckoning, there are six shastras. Vyākaraṇa is one of them. Four of the shastras are particularly important: Vyākaraṇa, Mīmāṃsā, Tarka, and Vedanta.

Tarka shastra has concepts called purva paksha and apara paksha. When one raises a point (purva paksha) the other party criticizes it (apara paksha). Then the debate starts. Each one tries to support his point of view by getting various references. The meaning of the word tarka also is specific, in that it does not imply a pure logical analysis but a complex activity of discourse guided by strict definitions and goals.

Tarka-Sangraha is a foundational text followed as guidelines for logic and discourse ever since it was composed in the second half of 17th century CE. Tarka may be translated as "hypothetical argument". Tarka is the process of questioning and cross-questioning that leads to a particular conclusion. It is a form of supposition that can be used as an aid to the attainment of valid knowledge.

There are several scholars renowned as well-versed in Tarka shastra: Adi Shankara (sixth century CE), Udyotakara (Nyāyavārttika, 6th–7th century), Vācaspati Miśra (Tatparyatika, 9th century), Ramanujacharya (9th century), Udayanacharya (Tātparyaparishuddhi, 10th century), Jayanta Bhatta (Nyāyamanjari, 9th century), Madhvacharya (13th century), Visvanatha (Nyāyasūtravṛtti, 17th century), Rādhāmohana Gosvāmī (Nyāyasūtravivarana, 18th century), and Kumaran Asan (1873–1924). Paruthiyur Krishna Sastri (1842–1911) and Sengalipuram Anantarama Dikshitar (1903–1969) specialized in Vyākaraṇa, Mīmāṃsā and Tarka shastra.

Bibliography
JSTOR:

WorldCat:
Krishna Jain (2011). Tarka-śāstra: eka rūpa-rekhā (Raj Verma Sinha, translator) [A textbook of logic: an introduction]. Naī Dillī: Ḍī. Ke. Priṇṭavarlḍa.
Pavitra Kumāra Śarmā (2007). Tarka śāstra. Jayapura: Haṃsā Prakāśana.  [language: Hindi]
Gulābarāya. Tarka śāstra. Kāśī: Nāgarīpracāriṇī Sabhā.  [language: Hindi] (on Hindu logic)
George William Brown (1915). Hindi logic. Jubbulpore: Christian Mission Press.  [language: Hindi]

External links
Tarka Shastra - Shastra Nethralaya
Samskara - The Forty Samskaras

Hindu philosophical concepts
Hermeneutics
Ritual